"All I Want" is a song by British girl group Mis-Teeq. It was written by Alesha Dixon, Sabrina Washington, David Brant, Alan Glass and Maryann Morgan and originally produced by David Brant (Vybrant Music). A UK garage remix by Ceri "Sunship" Evans was produced for their 2001 debut album Lickin' on Both Sides, and was released as a single, reaching  2 on the UK Singles Chart in 2001. It is their joint-biggest hit, along with "Scandalous" (2003).

Music video
The opening shows Su-Elise Nash staring into a mirror, before all three girls get sucked in. Once inside they sing and perform a dance routine before a white and gold backdrop. After Alesha Dixon's rap, the video breaks down into the Ignorants remix version of the song, the white and gold being replaced by pink, purple and blue. When the remix concludes, the video finished off as it began, with the three girls looking into the mirror, with Su-Elise proclaiming: "I just had a really weird daydream".

Track listings

Notes
  denotes first producer
  denotes additional vocal producer
  denotes additional producer

Charts

Weekly charts

Year-end charts

Certifications

Release history

References

2000 songs
2001 singles
Mis-Teeq songs
Songs written by Alesha Dixon
Telstar Records singles
UK garage songs